Dealul Spirii Trial (Romanian: Procesul din Dealul Spirii) was a political trial conducted by a military tribunal in the Kingdom of Romania. 271 members of the Communist Party of Romania were accused of treason after voting for the inclusion of the party into the Third International. The defendants were convicted and later pardoned.

The trial was the first step of the repression of communists in the Kingdom of Romania. Less than two years after the trial, the parliament voted a total ban of the Communist Party and communist ideology; for the next two decades, the government enforced a violent repression against the communists and labour unions.

A number of politicians and intellectuals, including Nicolae Iorga, Dem I. Dobrescu, and Iuliu Maniu voiced their discontent over the lack of constitutional basis for the trial.

Arrests

On May 12, 1921, the last day of the Congress of the Romanian Socialist-Communist Party, the party leaders (including Gheorghe Cristescu, Moscu Kohn, Mihai Gheorghiu Bujor, and Elek Köblös), as well as a large number of communist sympathisers were arrested by gendarmes and police who broke into the hall.

They were held for eight months in miserable conditions, the detention being extremely tough for all of them, being tortured and not being allowed to have visits of relatives. They were forced to work for the military, cleaning up the latrines and the courtyards of the barracks.

Charges
The communists were put into a joint trial with Max Goldstein, an anarchist who bombed the Senate, killing three people.

The charges included a large number of crimes including crime against the state security, terrorism, collaboration with the enemy and instigation to riot. The main evidence for the charges was that the communists voted for the affiliation of the party to the Third International.

Gheorghe Cristescu, the leader of the party was the main defendant. Constantin Cernat, the royal commissaire, accused him of "taking an active part in preaching the abolition of the present form of government, preaching rebellion, insulting and contempting state institutions". Cernat tried to prove the links between the Socialist movement in Romania and the Soviet Union.

Trial
Under the pretext that the courtroom was too small, the public was not allowed to witness the trial and only a small number of journalists were allowed inside.

The main defense attorney was Dem I. Dobrescu, the dean of the Bucharest Bar, helped by leading lawyers including Osvald Teodoreanu, Iorgu Petrovici, and N. D. Cocea. The defense brought 600 witnesses, while the prosecuting attorney brought 300 witnesses. 

In favour of the communists spoke General Alexandru Averescu, Iuliu Maniu, the managing director of Adevărul, and Constantin Mille; historian Nicolae Iorga said he supported the communists' right to a fair trial and argued that the affiliation to an international organization is not an action against state security.

The defense strategy was to try to separate the defenders into people who were arrested for their political activity (the communists) and the anarchists, such as Max Goldstein.

Verdict
All but 37 of the prisoners were convicted. Among those that were found innocent were Mihai Cruceanu, Moscu Kohn, Ilie Moscovici, Elek Köblös, and Constantin Popovici. The sentences for the Communist Party members varied from 1 month in prison to 10 years of forced labour; Goldstein was convicted to forced labour for life.

Amnesty
The defenders began a hunger strike. As the press began revealing the abuses in the prison, two prison guards, a captain and a lieutenant, were dismissed.

Lawyer Take Polikrat wrote a letter to King  Ferdinand I of Romania, asking him to show his goodwill toward the defendants. An amnesty was discussed in the government, after which, it was signed by the King on June 6, 1922, 213 of the prisoners being released. Excluded from amnesty were 48 of the defendants, who stood accused of high treason, military espionage or terrorist attacks.

References

1922 in Romania
Anti-communism in Romania
 
People detained by the Siguranța
Trials of political people
Trials in Romania
Kingdom of Romania
Political and cultural purges
Political repression in Romania
Socialism in Romania